Tseng Tau is a village of in the Shap Sze Heung area of Sai Kung North, in Tai Po District, Hong Kong, located near the shore of Three Fathoms Cove.

Administration
Tseng Tau is a recognized village under the New Territories Small House Policy.

History
The Shap Sze Heung Tsung Tsin Church of the Tsung Tsin Mission of Hong Kong was initially located in the Yat Sun School of Tseng Tau starting from 1954. A dedicated church building was later built in Nga Yiu Tau in 1960. The building is now vacant.

Conservation
Tseng Tau Coast, a coastal area of 1 km in length located north of the village and facing Three Fathom Cove, covering an area of 4.3 hectares, was designated as a Site of Special Scientific Interest in 1994.

See also
 Wu Chau

References

External links

 Delineation of area of existing village Tseng Tau (Sai Kung North) for election of resident representative (2019 to 2022)
 Pictures of Tseng Tau Village and Yat Sun School

Villages in Tai Po District, Hong Kong
Sai Kung North